Katale Airport  is an airport serving the village of Katale in North Kivu Province, Democratic Republic of the Congo.

See also

 Transport in the Democratic Republic of the Congo
 List of airports in the Democratic Republic of the Congo

References

External links
 OurAirports - Katale
 FallingRain - Katale Airport
 HERE Maps - Katale
 OpenStreetMap - Katale

Airports in North Kivu